Salehabad in Malard County, Iran may refer to:

 Mehrdasht, Tehran
 Salehabad-e Hesar-e Shalpush